Titi Uta (Aymara titi Andean mountain cat; lead, lead-coloured, uta house, "mountain cat house" or "lead house", also spelled Titiuta) is a mountain in the Andes of southern Peru, about  high. It is situated in the Puno Region, El Collao Province, Santa Rosa District.

References

Mountains of Puno Region
Mountains of Peru